This is a list of secondary schools in the Toronto District School Board.  The board is Canada's largest school board and governs 110 secondary schools, as well as five adult education schools. The TDSB was founded in 1954 as the Metropolitan Toronto School Board which would later merge with six anglophone boards: the Board of Education for the City of York, the East York Board of Education, the North York Board of Education, the Scarborough Board of Education, the Etobicoke Board of Education and the Toronto Board of Education to form the Toronto District School Board while the former francophone board of the MTSB merged with other boards in the same region to form Conseil scolaire Viamonde.

In secondary school, students may enter three general streams based on their goals upon graduation: academic for students planning on attending university, applied for students planning on attending college, and locally developed for students with special needs who are planning on entering the workforce.

Types of schools
Most TDSB secondary institutions operate as a collegiate institute, and provide secondary education in all types of subjects available (Arts, Tech, French, etc.) from grades 9–12 levels. University, college, and open streams are available at these institutions. In addition to Collegiate Institute, secondary institutions of this nature may also go by the name Academy, Collegiate and Technical Institute, Secondary School, or Technical School. Some schools in the legacy boards used Vocational School for slow learners and technical focused schools while the Scarborough Board of Education employed the name Business and Technical Institute from 1987 to 2019.

Several secondary institutions may have a stronger academic focus on a subject then most other schools as a specialized component. The school board operates several art-specialized secondary schools, typically called School of the Arts or School for the Arts. Some schools in the TDSB offer specialized programs to provide particular opportunities and to provide a focus on a variety of interests. Each specialized program has specific requirements as well as unique admission criteria. These include:
Africentric Secondary Program: Students are given an alternative way of learning in some of their courses through an Africentric lens.
Arts Focused Schools/Arts Program: Special programs offer a focus on the arts.
Entrepreneurship: A special program that develops the innovation, flexibility and self-reliance required to be successful in a business-driven environment.
Centre of Innovation for Skills and Technologies (CIST): Customized learning hubs focusing on science, technology, engineering and mathematics (STEM). Students focus on engineering design process through real-world applications with the goal of preparation for university level studies.

Alternative school are also operated by the school board for students who are at risk or failing, or may refer to schools that focus on independent study and are structured like a university. In some cases, the EdVance or diploma program is served to 18- to 20-year-olds who are out of or returning to school similar to a collegiate level. TDSB also operates A Safe and Caring School, is a special program for suspended or expelled students who are out of school or at-risk for improper behavioural issues at their home school.

The school board also operates several adult learning centres for adults over the age of 21 who are opting to return to secondary studies, or who are seeking to improve their skills.

List of secondary schools

Alternative schools

An alternative school may be for students who are at risk or failing, or may refer to schools that focus on independent study and are structured like university. In some cases, the EdVance or diploma program is served to 18- to 20-year-olds who are out of or returning to school, similar to a collegiate level. For adults over 21 who are returning to school or improving their skills, adult learning centers are offered.

Former schools

 A.P. Wheler Public School - built in 1901 as Scarborough SS#2 to replace two earlier schools and demolished in 1968 due to road realignment (McCowan Road); succeeded by Miliken Public School.

See also
List of Toronto District School Board elementary schools

List of educational institutions in Etobicoke
List of educational institutions in Scarborough
List of schools in the Conseil scolaire catholique MonAvenir
List of schools in the Conseil scolaire Viamonde
List of schools in the Toronto Catholic District School Board

Notes

References

 
Toronto District School Board